Jamides coritus is a butterfly in the family Lycaenidae. It was described by Félix Édouard Guérin-Méneville in 1831. It is found in New Guinea.

Subspecies
 Jamides coritus coritus (Misool, Salawati, Mioswar, Dore Bay, Arfak Mountains., Wandesi, Kapuar, Fak Fak, Triton Bay)
 Jamides coritus pseudeuchylas (Strand, 1911) (Geelvink Bay (islands), Wangaar R., Etna Bay, Humboldt Bay, Mt. Bougainville, New Guinea (Aitape), Aroa, Vailala R)
 Jamides coritus setekwaensis Tite, 1960 (West Irian: Setekwa, Oetakwa, Eilanden Rivers)

References

External links

Jamides Hübner, [1819] at Markku Savela's Lepidoptera and Some Other Life Forms. Retrieved June 3, 2017.

Jamides
Butterflies described in 1831